Peptoanaerobacter is a monotypic genus of bacteria in the family Peptostreptococcaceae. The only described species is Peptoanaerobacter stomatis.

References

Monotypic bacteria genera
Peptostreptococcaceae
Bacteria described in 2016